Modern pentathlon competitions made their debut at the 2019 Southeast Asian Games in Philippines and were held at the Subic Bay Boardwalk. Ironically, though an Olympic sport, it was not contested in the Olympic format.

Medal table

Medalists

References

External links
 

2019 Southeast Asian Games events
2019 in modern pentathlon